Kincora is a rural locality in the Toowoomba Region, Queensland, Australia. In the  Kincora had a population of 57 people.

History 
Kincora Provisional School opened on 7 May 1883. On 1 January 1909 it became Kincora State School. It closed on 28 January 1963.

In the  Kincora had a population of 57 people.

References 

Toowoomba Region
Localities in Queensland